The twelfth and final cycle of Britain's Next Top Model premiered on 19 October 2017 on Lifetime. This was the third cycle of the series to be hosted by former contestant Abbey Clancy. Photographer Nicky Johnston returned for the new series as well. Previous judges Hilary Alexander and Paul Sculfor did not return. Sculfor was replaced by British male model Max Rogers, while Hilary Alexander's place at judging remained open for a guest judge each week. This cycle re-introduced individual critiques as elimination.

The prizes for this cycle included a modelling contract with Models 1, a fashion spread in Cosmopolitan magazine, nationwide campaigns for Show Beauty, Missguided, Cinere, and Lola Make Up along with a yearly supply of each brand's products, and a gift of portable electronic devices courtesy of Alcatel.

The winner of the competition was 22-year-old Ivy Watson from Lincoln, Lincolnshire. Watson was the first and only winner of the show to have never placed in the bottom two.

Cast

Contestants
(Ages stated are at start of contest)

Judges
Abbey Clancy (host)
Cindy Bishop (host)
Nicky Johnston
Max Rogers

Episodes
{{Episode table |background= lightgray|overall= |season= |title= |airdate=|episodes=

{{Episode list
|EpisodeNumber   = 135
|EpisodeNumber2  = 7
|Title           = Episode 7
|OriginalAirDate =  
|ShortSummary    = The contestants were taken to the Blok London fitness center, and took part in a paired challenge for Fitbit overseen by former Pussycat Doll Kimberly Wyatt in which they had to perform in a series of instructional exercise videos. As the winners of the challenge, Cirrah Leah and Eleanor had their video featured on the brand's social media platforms. The models also had a beauty photo shoot inside a bathtub for Lola Make Up's new matte lipstick collection, whilst the judges secretly watched their performance in a separate room. Abbey Clancy later paid the contestants a visit to reveal that the remaining five models at the end of the episode would be flown to Thailand for the remainder of the competition, and that ''Asia's Next Top Models Cindy Bishop would be taking over the competition's hosting duties during their time abroad. At elimination, Karen Diamond, the agency director of Models 1, was introduced as the week's guest judge. The Photo's with the most praise are Ivy & Kira while Martha became ill during deliberation, and had to drop out of the competition per a doctor's advice due to her recurring fainting spells. As a result of the circumstances, no elimination took place.Special guests: Kimberly Wyatt, Karen Mcadoo, Estrella Corral, Karen DiamondFeatured photographer: Fern Berresford

|LineColor        = lightgray
}}

}}

Results

 
 The contestant was eliminated
 The contestant quit the competition
 The contestant was put through collectively to the next round
 The contestant was part of a non-elimination bottom two
 The contestant won the competition

Bottom two/three

 The contestant was eliminated after her first time in the bottom two/three
 The contestant was eliminated after her second time in the bottom two/three
 The contestant quit the competition
 The contestant was eliminated in the final judging and placed as the runner-up

Average  call-out order
Episode 7 & 10 is not included.

Notes

MakeoversTamsin - Cut to shoulder length and dyed chestnut brownEfi - Cut short with bangs and dyed brownLouisa - Cut to chin length and dyed chocolate brownShaunagh - Cut to chin length and dyed redMartha - Cut to shoulder length with pink highlights
 Cirrah Leah - Volumized curls and dyed ginger with matching eyebrowsSophia - Dyed dark brown with bangsEleanor - Cut to chin length and dyed light blondeKira - Pixie cut and dyed brownIvy''' - Cut to shoulder length and dyed platinum blonde

References

External links 
 Official website

12
2017 British television seasons
2017 Irish television seasons
Television shows filmed in England
Television shows filmed in Thailand